Michael Weston (born Michael Rubinstein; October 25, 1973) is an American television and film actor. His best-known roles are the private detective Lucas on House, the deranged and sadistic kidnapper Jake in the HBO serial drama Six Feet Under, and Pvt. Dancer on Scrubs, as well as Harry Houdini in Houdini & Doyle.

Early life
Michael Rubinstein was born in New York City, the son of actors John Rubinstein and Judi West. His paternal grandfather was Polish-Jewish piano virtuoso Arthur Rubinstein. He is also the great-grandson of Polish conductor Emil Młynarski, the founding conductor of the Warsaw Philharmonic Orchestra and principal conductor of the Scottish Orchestra.

He holds a degree in Theater and Arts from Northwestern University. In 2000 he changed his surname to "Weston" as there was already a "Michael Rubinstein" in the Screen Actors Guild.

Acting career
Weston is a good friend and former roommate of actor Zach Braff and has appeared in several features with him including Getting to Know You (1999), Garden State, Wish I Was Here and The Last Kiss, and as a guest star on Braff's television show, Scrubs. Weston has also appeared as Simon Marsden, Olivia Benson's half-brother on Law & Order: Special Victims Unit.

Weston appeared in the fifth season of House as a private investigator named Lucas Douglas hired by Dr. Gregory House; he reappeared in season six. Series creator David Shore planned a spin-off show with Weston's character as the lead in 2008, but the show never went into production.

In 2009, Weston appeared in the Gerard Butler action film Gamer. He made a guest appearance on White Collar and Burn Notice (in which the main character, Michael Westen, has a name very similar to his). In 2012, he starred in the A&E television movie, Coma.

In 2016, he appeared as Harry Houdini in Houdini & Doyle.

Personal life
Weston has been married to musician Priscilla Ahn since 2010.

Filmography

Film

Television

References

External links
 

1973 births
Living people
Male actors from New York City
American male film actors
American male television actors
American people of Polish descent
American people of Polish-Jewish descent
Northwestern University alumni
20th-century American male actors
21st-century American male actors